The 2008–09 Liga IV was the 67th season of the Liga IV, the fourth tier of the Romanian football league system. The champions of each county association play against one from a neighboring county in a play-off match played on a neutral venue. The winners of the play-off matches promoted to Liga III.

Promotion play-off 

The matches was scheduled to be played on 17 June 2009.

|}

County leagues

Alba County

Arad County

Bacău County 

Relegation play-out 
The teams on the 12th and 13th places in Liga IV Bacău face the teams on the 2nd place in the two series of the Liga V Bacău. All matches were played on 7 and 8 July 2009 at Letea Stadium in Bacău.

|}

Bihor County

Botoșani County 

Relegation play-off 
The 11th and 12th-placed teams of the Liga IV faces the 2nd placed teams from the two series of Liga V Botoșani.

Bucharest 
 Play-off 
All matches were played at Romprim Stadium in București on 2, 5 and 9 June 2009.
Group 1

Group 2 

Final 
The championship final was played on 11 June 2009 at Dinamo Stadium in București.

Comprest GIM București won the 2008–09 Liga IV Bucharest and qualify to promotion play-off in Liga III.

Caraș-Severin County

Cluj County

Covasna County

Galați County 

 Championship play-off

Hunedoara County

Ilfov County 
Championship play-off 
Championship play-off played in a single round-robin tournament between the best four teams of the regular season.

Mureș County 

Championship play-off 

Championship play-out

Neamț County

Prahova County

Satu Mare County 
Championship final 
The championship final was played on 6 June 2009 at Olimpia Stadium in Satu Mare.

''Turul Micula won the 2008–09 Liga IV Satu Mare County and qualify to promotion play-off in Liga III.

Suceava County

Timiș County

Vâlcea County

See also 
 2008–09 Liga I
 2008–09 Liga II
 2008–09 Liga III

References

External links
 FRF

Liga IV seasons
4
Romania